Keeping Our Love Warm is the sixth studio album by the American duo Captain & Tennille. Issued in 1980, it was their final full-length release recorded for Casablanca Records.

Background
Keeping Our Love Warm was the last major album from the duo.

Of the nine tracks, Toni Tennille wrote five of the songs, one of which, a re-recorded version of "Gentle Stranger" (as Tennille had originally envisioned it), was originally featured on their 1975 debut album Love Will Keep Us Together.

The duo performed the title track in the 1980 Macy's Thanksgiving Day Parade.

Track listing
 "Keepin' Our Love Warm" (Toni Tennille) - 2:55
 "Until You Come Back to Me (That's What I'm Gonna Do)" (Morris Broadnax, Clarence Paul, Stevie Wonder) - 4:06
 "Gentle Stranger" (Toni Tennille) - 3:58
 "But I Think It's A Dream" (Toni Tennille) - 4:13
 "Since I Fell For You" (Buddy Johnson) - 4:40
 "Don't Forget Me" (Toni Tennille) - 3:05
 "Song For My Father" (Horace Silver) - 6:19
 "This Is Not The First Time" (Toni Tennille) - 4:09
 "Your Good Thing (Is About to End)" (Isaac Hayes, David Porter) - 5:33

Personnel
Toni Tennille - acoustic piano, composer, Fender Rhodes, liner notes, vocal arrangement, vocals
Daryl Dragon - producer, ARP Odyssey, ARP Omni, ARP String, bass guitar, clavinet, cover art concept, Yamaha CS-80, Fender Rhodes, Fender Telecaster, Moog bass, Oberheim synthesizer, percussion, acoustic piano, Roland synthesizer, tack piano, vibraphone
John Beal - horn arrangements
Melissa Boettner - background vocals
Les Cooper & the Soul Rockers - engineers
Jon Crosse - flute, tenor saxophone
Paulinho Da Costa - congas, percussion, quica
Dennis Dragon - mixing
Paul Gross - graphic design
Gary Heery - photography
Rusty Higgins - flute, horn arrangements, alto and soprano saxophones, soloist
Carolisa Lindberg - cello
Steve Nelson Quartet - bass
Ira Newborn - guitar
Lenard Ruth - background vocals
Steve Schaeffer - drums
Bill Severance - drums
Frederick Seykora - cello
Gary Wasserman - trombone
Roger Young - engineer, mixing

References

1980 albums
Captain & Tennille albums
Casablanca Records albums